The Alwi Mosque is a mosque in Kangar, Perlis, Malaysia.

Name
The mosque is named after the Raja of Perlis at that time, Raja Syed Alwi Ibni Almarhum Tuan Syed Saffi Jamalullail.

History
Efforts to collect funds to construct the mosque began in the 1920s. Construction began in 1931 and was completed in 1933. It was then officially opened by Raja Syed Alwi. The mosque was declared a national heritage in 1988 under the National Heritage Act 2005.

Architecture
The mosque was constructed with Mughal architecture in mind.

See also
 Islam in Malaysia
 List of mosques in Malaysia

References

External links

 Facebook - Masjid ALWI, Kangar

1933 establishments in British Malaya
Mosques in Perlis
Kangar
Mosques completed in 1933
Mosque buildings with domes